Dogs, as with all mammals, have natural odors. Natural dog odor can be unpleasant to dog owners especially when dogs are kept inside the home, as some people are not used to being exposed to the natural odor of a non-human species living in proximity to them. Dogs may also develop unnatural odors as a result of skin disease or other disorders or may become contaminated with odors from other sources in their environment.

Healthy odors 
 
All natural dog odors are most prominent near the ears and from the paw pads. Dogs naturally produce secretions, the function of which is to produce scents allowing for individual animal recognition by dogs and other species in the scent-marking of territory. 

Dogs only produce sweat on areas not covered with fur, such as the nose and paw pads, unlike humans who sweat almost everywhere. However, they do have sweat glands, called apocrine glands, associated with every hair follicle on the body.  The exact function of these glands is not known, but they may produce pheromones or chemical signals for communication with other dogs. It is believed that these sweat secretions produce an individual odor signal that is recognizable by other dogs.

Dogs also have sweat glands on their noses.  These are eccrine glands.  When these glands are active, they leave the nose and paw pads slightly moist and help these specialized skin features maintain their functional properties. The odor associated with dog paw pads is much more noticeable on dogs with moist paw pads than on those with dry pads.

Dogs also have numerous apocrine glands in their external ear canals. In this location, they are referred to as ceruminous glands.  The ear canals also have numerous sebaceous glands.  Together, these two sets of glands produce natural ear wax, or cerumen.  Micro-organisms live naturally in this material and give the ears a characteristic slightly yeasty odor, even when healthy. When infected, the ears can give off a strong disagreeable smell.  It is not uncommon for a veterinarian to sniff a dog's ears to try to detect any potential bacterial or fungal infection. Some owners do this routinely if they have a dog susceptible to ear infections or if they have a breed with heavy, floppy ears, which can hide early signs of inflammation.

Dogs, like all Carnivorans, also possess two anal sacs, or scent glands.  These sacs communicate with the surface of the skin by ducts which open on either side of the anus.  The sacs are lined with apocrine and sebaceous glands.  They function to produce a natural secretion that varies from thin and yellowish to pasty and greyish; the secretion has a very strong musky odor.  A small amount of this material is deposited when dogs defecate.  A large amount may be extruded when a dog is frightened.  It is thought that this secretion leaves a signal to other dogs allowing them to recognize the source of the individual fecal deposit.  This odor is also likely the signal being sampled when strange dogs investigate one another by sniffing out the anal area. Dogs' anal glands can become swollen and unable to drain naturally, sometimes requiring a visit to the veterinarian or groomer to express the built up liquid. Excessive licking and chewing of the area is one indication of this. Typically, these glands are expressed during routine professional grooming as a preventative measure.

Another source of natural odor results from a common dog behavior: rolling in and marking themselves with the feces of other animals in their environment.

Unhealthy odors 
Poor grooming of dogs with long, thick or corded hair can cause the haircoat to be a source of unpleasant odor. A coat that is not kept clean and groomed can trap dirt and other substances with unpleasant odors.
 
Skin diseases can cause a dog to have increased or abnormal odor. Allergy can cause increased production of apocrine sweat, which imparts a musty odor. This condition, termed hyperhidrosis, can encourage yeast infection or bacterial skin infection and these micro-organisms produce odors as well. Dogs with seborrhea or keratinization defect, and dogs with deep skin folds (such as on the face of a bulldog), are very subject to secondary proliferation of bacteria or yeast on the skin surface, and these produce odors.

Ear disease (otitis) can be a source of odor that varies from yeasty to one resembling sewage as either cerumen or pus accumulates in the diseased ear canal. Anal sac disease or excessive anal sac production can cause a very musty pungent odor.  Anal sacs can become abscessed and infecting micro-organisms produce odor.

Dental disease or mouth ulcers can produce rotten smelling breath (halitosis). Dental calculus harbors numerous bacteria which produce odor and foul breath. Dental disease can also lead to excessive drooling, and the skin around the mouth can become infected, leading to more odor production. Dogs can also acquire foul smelling breath as a result of coprophagia, the practice of eating their own feces or the feces of other animals. Commercially prepared food additives can be purchased which, when added to a dog's food, impart a bitter flavor to their feces thereby reducing the tendency towards consuming their own feces.
 
Some medications, such as antibiotics, taken by mouth or antiseptics or medicated shampoos used on the skin can produce odors that owners may find unpleasant. Likewise, some food ingredients, most noticeably fish meal or fish oil, can produce skin odor in dogs.

Flatulence can be a problem for some dogs, which may be diet-related or a sign of gastrointestinal disease.  This, in fact, may be the most commonly noticed source of odor from dogs fed cereal-based dog foods.

Skunks and dogs often have aggressive encounters and a dog may be sprayed by a skunk. This results in an over-powering musky acrid odor that remains apparent in the 'skunked' dog's coat for many days or even weeks until steps are taken to neutralize the odor.

See also
Hyena butter
Wet dog bush

References

External links 
 Veterinary Partner:halitosis
 Veterinary Q & A: My Stinky Dog

Animal communication
Animal physiology
Dog health
Olfactory system